Delesseria sanguinea is a red marine seaweed.

Description
Delesseria sanguinea is a common and bright red perennial alga with flat leaf-like red blades rising from a discoid holdfast. The blades are monostromatic, that is composed of a layers of single cells, and can grow to 25 cm long. Each blade rises from a cylindrical stipe, the stalk-like part, which branches only at near the base. Each blade may 8 cm wide and show a clear midrib with lateral veins. The tips of the blades are rounded.
Other similar algae include: Apoglossum ruscifolium, Hypoglossum hypoglossoides and Membranoptera alata all of which are much smaller. Phycodrys rubens is of comparable size but can be easily distinguished having lobed edges to the blades.

Reproduction
All reproductive bladelets are formed on the midrib. Male reproduction bladelets and reach 6 mm long. Spermatangial sori develop on both sides of the midrib on the blade are  form a continuous sorus on the blade, oval in shape. Female bladelets have a narrow lamina and cystocarp forms near the apex on a short stalk. Tetrasporangial bladelets are oval in shape and up to 4 mm in size.

Habitat
Growing on rock in pools at low water and also sublittoral to 30 m deep epiphytic on other large algae.

Distribution
Common around Ireland, Great Britain, Isle of Man, Channel Islands, to the north to Norway and Iceland south in Spain.

References

Further reading
Dickinson, C.I. 1963 British Seaweeds. The Kew Series. Eyre & Spottiswoods
Morton, O. 1994. Marine Algae of Northern Ireland. Ulster Museum.
Morton, O. 2003. The marine macroalgae of County Donegal, Ireland. Bulletin of Irish biogeographical Society No 27.

Delesseriaceae